The National Civic Art Society is a nonprofit organization that advocates and promotes public art, architecture, and urbanism in the classical tradition and opposes the inclusion of modern and contemporary architectural styles.  The Society has various regional chapters that host local events and outreach. The organization is headquartered in Washington, D.C. The Society has been active in discussions regarding memorials in Washington, D.C. and the rebuilding of the original Penn Station in New York City. The Society led a six-year campaign against Frank Gehry's proposed design for the Dwight D. Eisenhower Memorial, which forced the architect to make changes to his original scheme.

In 2020, the Society organized a survey of 2,000 American adults by The Harris Poll to determine people's preferred architecture for federal buildings and U.S. courthouses. The survey showed participants pairs of side-by-side photographs of federal buildings similar in shape, size, and color, with one of the buildings being traditional, the other modern. As Bloomberg reported, "The responses did not vary by demographic group: When asked to choose from the two images, Americans of every age, sex, race and class category pulled the lever for traditional designs by a nearly 3 to 1 margin. Overall, classical won out over modern by 72% to 28%." 

The National Civic Art Society's president is Justin Shubow, a former chairman of the U.S. Commission of Fine Arts. Under his leadership, the Society is reported to have played a key role in the passage of the Executive Order "Promoting Beautiful Federal Civic Architecture," which encouraged traditional and classical architecture for federal buildings.

See also
Classical order
Classical architecture
Traditional architecture
New Classical architecture

References

External links
National Civic Art Society

Architecture organizations based in the United States
Arts organizations based in Washington, D.C.
New Classical architecture
Classical architecture